Csaba László (born 18 August 1967, in Várpalota) is a Hungarian football player who played for BVSC Budapest.

References

1967 births
Living people
People from Várpalota
Hungarian footballers
Fehérvár FC players
Gázszer FC footballers
Budapesti VSC footballers
Association football defenders
Sportspeople from Veszprém County